Cable News is responsible for the newsgathering operation of Cable Television in Hong Kong. It is run by i-CABLE News Limited. One of its many channels is the i-CABLE News Channel.

Cable News Hong Kong incorporates 3 channels.
i-CABLE Finance Info Channel
i-CABLE News Channel
i-CABLE Live News Channel

Anchors
 Jolly Wong (Chief Anchors)
 Venus Cheung (Principal Anchors)
 Kenix Lau (Principal Anchors)
 Candace Ho (Principal Anchors)
 Kammily Cheung(Senior Anchors)
 Vincent Chan
 Karkar Chin
 Vicky Wong
 Cherry Chan
 Mavis Wong
 Joshua Kwok
 Agnes Kwok (Seconded from i-CABLE Finance Info Channel)

former well-known anchors:
 Lavender Cheung
 Joanne Yung
 Anny Chong
 Taly Yau
 Carman Tsang
 Kimmy Ng
 Kenix Wong
 Circle Lo
 Hedy Wong
 Icy Cheung
 Jasmine Law
 Venus Wong
 Petrina Wong
 Tracy Kwan

Slogan
At the Forefront of Facts

Television stations in Hong Kong

External links
i-CABLE News